Elections for the City of Edinburgh District Council took place on 3 May 1977, alongside elections to the councils of Scotland's various other districts. These were the second election to the City of Edinburgh District Council. Conservatives won a majority with 34 of the Council's 64 seats. Across Scotland the elections saw the Conservatives and SNP make gains, while Labour lost seats. The Glasgow Herald said the Conservatives gaining control of Edinburgh District Council "crowned" what was "a night of considerable success" for the party.

Writing in the The Glasgow Herald, journalist Tom McConnell stated that "it was a disappointing night" for the SNP in Edinburgh, as while the party came close to taking several seats from Labour,  in the end they managed to gain just three seats and also failed to trouble the Conservatives. He also blamed the Liberal result, which saw the party lose two of the three seats they had held, on voters reacting negatively to the recent Lib-Lab pact.

Aggregate results

Ward results

References

1977
Edinburgh
District Council election, 1977